MaxStat is a statistical analysis software platform specifically designed for students and researchers with little background in statistics. It was developed in Germany by MaxStat Software.

The MaxStat Lite version is offered free of charge and can be used for smaller projects and theses. The full version, MaxStat Pro, offers analysis of larger data sets. Both versions include over 50 statistical procedures and basic charts.

Functionality

The Lite version features descriptive statistics, hypothesis testing (t-tests, chi-square, 1-way ANOVA with post-hocs, non-parametric tests), distribution testing, linear regression, correlation and a selection of basic graphing functions. It is limited to 254 rows and 12 columns of data, and does not offer import or export functions. The Pro version features advanced analyses (unlimited rows and columns, import and export, more means of analyses (2-way ANOVA, logistic and nonlinear regression, principal component analysis and multidimensional scaling, time series, power/sample-size, factorial design), more types of graph, word processing functions and options for formatting of results.

References

External links
Official Website

Statistical software